The National Seminary of Catholic Church in China is a Catholic university in Daxing District of Beijing, capital of China.

History 
The National Seminary of Catholic Church in China was established in September 1983. The official opening of the university was on September 24, 1983.

List of presidents

References

External links
 

 
Universities and colleges in Beijing
Educational institutions established in 1983
1983 establishments in China
Seminaries and theological colleges